This is a summary of notable incidents that have taken place at various Legoland theme parks, amusement parks, or water parks.  This list is not intended to be a comprehensive list of every such event, but only those that have a significant impact on the parks or park operations, or are otherwise significantly newsworthy.

The term incidents refers to major accidents, injuries, or deaths that occur at a Legoland park.  While these incidents were required to be reported to regulatory authorities due to where they occurred, they usually fall into one of the following categories:

 Caused by negligence on the part of the guest.  This can be refusal to follow specific ride safety instructions, or deliberate intent to violate park rules.
 The result of a guest's known, or unknown, health issues.
 Negligence on the part of the park, either by ride operator or maintenance.
 Act of God or a generic accident (e.g. slipping and falling), that is not a direct result of an action on anybody's part.

Legoland, Billund, Denmark

The Xtreme Racer 

 On 29 April 2007, a 21-year-old park employee was killed by a ride vehicle on The Xtreme Racer, a roller coaster at the Billund, Denmark park, as she climbed over a security fence to retrieve a guest's wallet.

Legoland Deutschland Resort, Günzburg, Germany

Feuerdrache 

 On August 11, 2022, 31 people were injured with one suffering serious injuries when two carriages collided. The cause of the accident is currently being investigated.

Legoland Windsor Resort, Berkshire, England 

 In 2006, a fire broke out in a storage barn onsite during the end of season fireworks on 28 October, with no injuries.
 In October 2007, a fire broke out in a shed being used to store chemicals.
 In May 2009, a nine-year-old girl got her hand trapped in The Log Flume in Pirate Falls. The police, ambulance and fire brigade were all called. The ride remained closed the next day as health and safety checks were done and the ride has since been altered.
 In September 2010, the park's large number of wasps during the season was discussed on Watchdog, with general manager Sue Kemp appearing with host Anne Robinson and confirming new signage, actions and details on the website.
 In February 2014, the park cancelled a private event organised by Islamic cleric Haitham al-Haddad due to safety reasons following a backlash and threats by nationalist groups.
 In August 2016, two six-year-old girls were sexually assaulted while at the resort, leading to a police investigation over the incident.
 In 2019, a five-year-old boy was involved in an accessibility dispute at Ninjago: the Ride making national news. It was settled in late 2020.

References 

Legoland
Incidents
Health-related lists